Léon Klares (born November 13, 1935) is a Luxembourgian sprint canoer who competed in the early 1960s. He was eliminated in the repechages of the K-2 1000 m event at the 1960 Summer Olympics in Rome.

References
Sports-reference.com profile

1935 births
Canoeists at the 1960 Summer Olympics
Living people
Luxembourgian male canoeists
Olympic canoeists of Luxembourg
Place of birth missing (living people)